Saint-Hyacinthe Aerodrome  is located  west of Saint-Hyacinthe, Quebec, Canada.

The Saint-Hyacinthe Aerodrome is an example of general aviation diversity driven by private management.

Almost all airplanes on floats land on its man-made water basin, parallel to the runway. Single and twin engine conventional aircraft, ultralight two and three axis, aerobatic airplanes, vintage aircraft and motor gliders fly regularly from the narrow ( runway.

Weekends with nice weather are particularly busy. Aviation enthusiasts can admire aerobatics performed in the aerobatic box at the west of the airport, formation flights, low passes, and overshoot training.

Aviation schools and repair shops are present.

All hangar spaces are sold out and more hangars under construction drive the need for more space for hangars and an extra runway to permit landings when crosswinds are too strong to permit a safe return in such conditions.

The only runway stays quite busy during the days when strong winds blow perpendicularly to the runway axis. Crosswinds of this strength rattle the hangars and keep almost everybody grounded.

References

External links
 Clip showing a landing at the St-Hyacinthe Airport from a motor glider cockpit

Transport in Saint-Hyacinthe
Buildings and structures in Saint-Hyacinthe
Registered aerodromes in Montérégie